The following outline is provided as an overview of and topical guide to Montenegro:

Montenegro – sovereign country located on the Balkan Peninsula in Southern Europe.  It has a coast on the Adriatic Sea to the south and borders Croatia to the west, Bosnia and Herzegovina to the northwest, Serbia and Kosovo to the northeast, Albania to the southeast. Its capital and largest city is Podgorica, while Cetinje is designated as the Prijestonica (meaning the old royal capital or former seat of the throne).

The thousand-year history of the Montenegrin state begins in the 9th century with the emergence of Duklja, a vassal state of Byzantium. In those formative years, Duklja was ruled by the Vojislavljevic dynasty. In 1042, at the end of his 25-year rule, King Vojislav won a decisive battle near Bar against Byzantium, and Duklja became independent. Duklja's power and prosperity reached their zenith under King Vojislav's son, King Mihailo (1046–81), and his son King Bodin (1081–1101). From the 11th century, it started to be referred to as Zeta. It ended with its incorporation into Serbia in the late 1180s. Beginning with the Crnojević dynasty (late 15th century), Upper Zeta was more often referred to as Crna Gora or by the Venetian term . A sovereign principality since the Late Middle Ages, Montenegro saw its independence from the Ottoman Empire formally recognized in 1878. From 1918, it was a part of various incarnations of Yugoslavia. On the basis of a referendum held on 21 May 2006, Montenegro declared independence on 3 June. On 28 June 2006, it became the 192nd member state of the United Nations, and on 11 May 2007 the 47th member state of the Council of Europe. On 15 December 2008, Montenegro presented its official application to the European Union, with the hopes of gaining EU candidate status by 2009.

General reference 

 Pronunciation:
 Common English country name:  Montenegro
 Official English country name: Montenegro
 Common endonym(s): Crna Gora – Црна Гора
 Official endonym(s): Crna Gora – Црна Гора
 Adjectival(s): Montenegrin
 Demonym(s):
 Etymology: Name of Montenegro
 International rankings of Montenegro
 ISO country codes:  ME, MNE, 499
 ISO region codes:  See ISO 3166-2:ME
 Internet country code top-level domain:  .me

Geography of Montenegro 

Geography of Montenegro
 Montenegro is: a country
 Location:
 Eastern Hemisphere
 Northern Hemisphere
 Eurasia
 Europe
 Southern Europe
 Balkans (also known as "Southeastern Europe")
 Time zone:  Central European Time (UTC+01), Central European Summer Time (UTC+02)
 Extreme points of Montenegro
 High:  Zla Kolata 
 Low:  Adriatic Sea 0 m
 Land boundaries:  625 km
 225 km
 172 km
 203 km
 25 km
 Coastline:  Adriatic Sea 293.5 km
 Population of Montenegro: 598,000  - 162nd most populous country

 Area of Montenegro: 13,812 km2
 Atlas of Montenegro

Environment of Montenegro 

 Climate of Montenegro
 Renewable energy in Montenegro
 Geology of Montenegro
 Protected areas of Montenegro
 Biosphere reserves in Montenegro
 National parks of Montenegro
 Wildlife of Montenegro
 Fauna of Montenegro
 Birds of Montenegro
 Mammals of Montenegro

Natural geographic features of Montenegro 
 Glaciers of Montenegro
 Islands of Montenegro
 Lakes of Montenegro
 Mountains of Montenegro
 Rivers of Montenegro
 World Heritage Sites in Montenegro

Regions of Montenegro 

Regions of Montenegro

Ecoregions of Montenegro 

List of ecoregions in Montenegro
 Ecoregions in Montenegro

Administrative divisions of Montenegro 

Administrative divisions of Montenegro
 Municipalities of Montenegro

Municipalities of Montenegro 

Municipalities of Montenegro
 Capital of Montenegro: Podgorica
 Cities of Montenegro

Demography of Montenegro 

Demographics of Montenegro

Government and politics of Montenegro 

Politics of Montenegro
 Form of government:
 Capital of Montenegro: Podgorica
 Elections in Montenegro
 Political parties in Montenegro

Branches of the government of Montenegro 

Government of Montenegro

Executive branch of the government of Montenegro 
 Head of state: President of Montenegro,
 Head of government: Prime Minister of Montenegro,
 Cabinet of Montenegro

Legislative branch of the government of Montenegro 

 Parliament of Montenegro (unicameral)

Judicial branch of the government of Montenegro 

Court system of Montenegro
 Supreme Court of Montenegro

Foreign relations of Montenegro 
Foreign relations of Montenegro
 Diplomatic missions in Montenegro
 Diplomatic missions of Montenegro
 Montenegro–Serbia relations

International organization membership 
Montenegro is a member of:

Central European Initiative (CEI)
Council of Europe (CE)
Euro-Atlantic Partnership Council (EAPC)
European Bank for Reconstruction and Development (EBRD)
Food and Agriculture Organization (FAO)
International Atomic Energy Agency (IAEA)
International Bank for Reconstruction and Development (IBRD)
International Civil Aviation Organization (ICAO)
International Criminal Court (ICCt)
International Criminal Police Organization (Interpol)
International Development Association (IDA)
International Federation of Red Cross and Red Crescent Societies (IFRCS)
International Finance Corporation (IFC)
International Labour Organization (ILO)
International Maritime Organization (IMO)
International Mobile Satellite Organization (IMSO)
International Monetary Fund (IMF)
International Olympic Committee (IOC)
International Organization for Migration (IOM)
International Organization for Standardization (ISO) (correspondent)
International Red Cross and Red Crescent Movement (ICRM)
International Telecommunication Union (ITU)

International Trade Union Confederation (ITUC)
Inter-Parliamentary Union (IPU)
Multilateral Investment Guarantee Agency (MIGA)
Organization for Security and Cooperation in Europe (OSCE)
Organisation for the Prohibition of Chemical Weapons (OPCW)
Partnership for Peace (PFP)
Permanent Court of Arbitration (PCA)
Southeast European Cooperative Initiative (SECI)
United Nations (UN)
United Nations Educational, Scientific, and Cultural Organization (UNESCO)
United Nations High Commissioner for Refugees (UNHCR)
United Nations Industrial Development Organization (UNIDO)
United Nations Mission in Liberia (UNMIL)
Universal Postal Union (UPU)
World Customs Organization (WCO)
World Federation of Trade Unions (WFTU)
World Health Organization (WHO)
World Intellectual Property Organization (WIPO)
World Meteorological Organization (WMO)
World Tourism Organization (UNWTO)
World Trade Organization (WTO) (observer)

Law and order in Montenegro 

Law of Montenegro
 Constitution of Montenegro
 Crime in Montenegro
 Human rights in Montenegro
 LGBT rights in Montenegro
 Freedom of religion in Montenegro
 Law enforcement in Montenegro

Military of Montenegro 

Military of Montenegro
 Command
 Commander-in-chief:
 Ministry of Defence of Montenegro
 Forces
 Army of Montenegro
 Navy of Montenegro
 Air Force of Montenegro
 Special forces of Montenegro
 Military history of Montenegro
 Military ranks of Montenegro

Local government in Montenegro 

Local government in Montenegro

History of Montenegro 

History of Montenegro
Timeline of the history of Montenegro
Current events of Montenegro
 Military history of Montenegro

Culture of Montenegro 

Culture of Montenegro
 Architecture of Montenegro
 Cuisine of Montenegro
 Festivals in Montenegro
 Languages of Montenegro
 Media in Montenegro
 National symbols of Montenegro
 Coat of arms of Montenegro
 Flag of Montenegro
 National anthem of Montenegro
 People of Montenegro
 Public holidays in Montenegro
 Records of Montenegro
 Religion in Montenegro
 Christianity in Montenegro
 Hinduism in Montenegro
 Islam in Montenegro
 Judaism in Montenegro
 Sikhism in Montenegro
 World Heritage Sites in Montenegro

Art in Montenegro 
 Art in Montenegro
 Cinema of Montenegro
 Literature of Montenegro
 Music of Montenegro
 Television in Montenegro
 Theatre in Montenegro

Sports in Montenegro 

Sports in Montenegro
 Football in Montenegro
 Montenegro at the Olympics

Economy and infrastructure of Montenegro 

Economy of Montenegro
 Economic rank, by nominal GDP (2007): 149th (one hundred and forty ninth)
 Agriculture in Montenegro
 Banking in Montenegro
 National Bank of Montenegro
 Communications in Montenegro
 Internet in Montenegro
 Companies of Montenegro
Currency of Montenegro: Euro (see also: Euro topics)
ISO 4217: EUR
 Energy in Montenegro
 Energy policy of Montenegro
 Oil industry in Montenegro
 Health in Montenegro
 Mining in Montenegro
 Montenegro Stock Exchange
 Tourism in Montenegro
 Transport in Montenegro
 Airports in Montenegro
 Rail transport in Montenegro
 Roads in Montenegro
 Water supply and sanitation in Montenegro

Education in Montenegro 

Education in Montenegro

See also 

Montenegro
Index of Montenegro-related articles
List of international rankings
List of Montenegro-related topics
Member state of the United Nations
Montenegrin language
Outline of Europe
Outline of geography

References

External links 

 Republic of Montenegro
 Photogallery - Montenegro's nature
 
 
 
 Montenegro. The World Factbook. Central Intelligence Agency.

Montenegro